The Triqui, or Trique, languages are a family of Oto-Manguean spoken by 30,000 Trique people of the Mexican states of Oaxaca and the state of Baja California in 2007 (due to recent population movements). They are also spoken by 5,000 immigrants to the United States. Triqui languages belong to the Mixtecan branch together with the Mixtec languages and Cuicatec.

Varieties
Ethnologue lists three major varieties: 
Triqui de Copala spoken by 15,000 people (1990 census) in San Juan Copala, Oaxaca (and recently due to migrations in the San Quintín valley, Baja California).
Triqui de San Andrés Chicahuaxtla spoken by 6,000 people in San Andrés Chicahuaxtla, Oaxaca.
Triqui de San Martín Itunyoso spoken by 2,000 people (1983 survey) in San Martín Itunyoso, Oaxaca.

Mexico's federal agency for its indigenous languages, Instituto Nacional de Lenguas Indígenas (INALI), identifies four varieties of Trique in its Catálogo de las lenguas indígenas nacionales published in early 2008. The variants listed by INALI are:

Phonology
The following phonology is based on Hollenbach (1984) and DiCanio (2008):

Vowels

Consonants 

Itunyoso Triqui may tend to have ten geminated consonants; /mː, βː, tː, nː, lː, tːʃ, jː, ʈːʂ, kː, kːʷ/.

Tones 
All varieties of Triqui are tonal and have complex phonologies. The tone system of Copala Triqui is the best described and has eight tones.

Tones in Triqui languages are typically written with superscript numbers, so that chraa5 'river' indicates the syllable chraa with the highest (5) tone, while cha3na1 'woman' has the middle (3) tone on the first syllable and the lowest (1) tone on the second syllable.

Of the Triqui languages, the Copala dialect has undergone the most vowel loss, with many non-final syllables losing their vowels. The result, as in many other Oto-Manguean languages, is a complex set of consonant clusters. So, for instance, the word si5kuj5 'cow' in Itunyoso Triqui corresponds to skuj5 in Copala Triqui.

The tonal phonology of other Triqui languages is more complex than Copala Triqui. The tone system of Itunyoso Triqui has nine tones. The tone system of Chicahuaxtla Triqui has at least 10 tones  but may have as many as 16.

Orthography
Triqui has been written in a number of different orthographies, depending on the intended audience. Linguists typically write the language with all tones fully marked and all phonemes represented. However, in works intended for native speakers of Triqui, a practical orthography is often used with a somewhat simpler representation.

The following Copala Triqui example is written in both the practical (first line) and the linguistic (second line) orthographies:

Morphology
Triqui bound morphology is fairly limited. Verbs take a /k-/ prefix (spelled c- or qu-) to show completive aspect:

A'mii32 zo'1.
'You are speaking'.

C-a'mii32 zo'1.
'You spoke'.

The same /k-/ prefix plus a tonal change shows the potential aspect:

C-a'mii2 zo'1.
'You will speak.'

The tonal changes associated with the potential aspect are complex but always involve lowering the tone of the root (Hollenbach 1984).

There are also complex phonological processes that are triggered by the presence of root-final clitic pronouns. These pronouns (especially the first- and the second-person singular) may change the shape of the stem or alter its tone.

As a language subfamily, Triqui is interesting for having a large tonal inventory, complex morphophonology, and interesting syntactic phenomena, much of which has yet to be described.

Syntax
Copala Triqui has a verb-subject-object word order:

Copala Triqui has an accusative marker maa3 or man3, which is obligatory for animate pronominal objects but optional otherwise:

This use of the accusative before some objects and not others is what is called differential object marking.

The following example (repeated from above) shows a Copala Triqui question:

As this example shows, Copala Trique has wh-movement and pied-piping with inversion.

Copala Triqui syntax is described in Hollenbach (1992).

Triqui is interesting for having toggle processes as well. For negation, a completive aspect prefix signifies the negative potential. A potential aspect prefix in the same context signifies the negative completive.

Sample text 
The following is a sample of Copala Triqui taken from a legend about the sun and the moon. The first column is Copala Triqui, the second is a Spanish translation, and the third is an English translation.

Media
Triqui-language programming is carried by the CDI's radio stations XEQIN-AM, based in San Quintín, Baja California, and XETLA, based in Tlaxiaco, Oaxaca.

Use 
As of 2012, the Natividad Medical Center of Salinas, California, was training medical interpreters bilingual in one of the Oaxacan languages (including Trique, Mixteco, or Zapotec), as well as in Spanish. In March 2014, Natividad Medical Foundation launched Indigenous Interpreting+, "a community and medical interpreting business specializing in indigenous languages from Mexico and Central and South America," including Trique, Mixteco, Zapotec, and Chatino.

A Trique-speaking community has also settled in Albany, New York, as well as in northwestern Washington.

Notes

Bibliography
 Broadwell, George A., Kosuke Matsukawa, Edgar Martín del Campo, Ruth Scipione and Susan Perdomo. 2009. The Origin of the Sun and Moon: A Copala Triqui Legend. Munich: LINCOM Europa.
 DiCanio, Christian. 2008. The Phonetics and Phonology of San Martín Itunyoso Trique. Ph.D. dissertation: University of California, Berkeley.
Elliott, A. Raymond. 2020. A method comparison analysis examining the relationship between linguistic tone, melodic tune, and sung performances of children’s songs in Chicahuaxtla Triqui: Findings and implications for documentary linguistics and indigenous language communities. Language Documentation & Conservation. Vol. 14, pp. 139-187.
Elliott, A. Raymond. 2017. Ruhuâ Ruˈman Hioˈóo Gatsii ‘IN THE HOLE OF WHITE DIRT’ LEGEND IN CHICAHUAXTLA TRIQUI. International Journal of American Linguistics: Online Texts. Vol. 2, no. 1, pp. 1-32. 
Elliott, A. Raymond, Pablo Hernández Cruz, Fausto Sandoval Cruz. 2020. Dàj guruguiˈ yumiguiì ‘de como apareció la gente del mundo’: leyenda en triqui de Chicahuaxtla. Tlalocan. Vol. 25, 147-212.
Elliott, A. Raymond, Jerold A. Edmondson, and Fausto Sandoval Cruz. 2016. “Chicahuaxtla Triqui.” Journal of the International Phonetic Association, February, 1–15. .
Elliott, A. Raymond, Fulgencio Sandoval Cruz, and Felipe Santiago Rojas. 2012. “Notes from the Field: Chicahuaxtla Triqui Digital Wordlist and Preliminary Observations” 6: 208–36.
 Good, Claude. 1979. Diccionario Triqui, volume 20 of Serie de Vocabularios Indigenas. Summer Institute of Linguistics, Mexico.
 Hollenbach, Barbara. 1977.  El origen del sol y de la  luna – cuatro versiones en el trique de Copala, Tlalocan 7:123-70.
 Hollenbach, Barbara. 1984. The phonology and morphology of tone and laryngeals in Copala Trique.  Ph.D. thesis, University of Arizona.
 Hollenbach, Barbara, 1988.  Three  Trique myths of San Juan Copala.  Mexico City: Summer Institute of Linguistics.
 Hollenbach, Barbara. 1992. A syntactic sketch of Copala Trique. in C. Henry Bradley & Barbara E. Hollenbach, eds. Studies in the syntax of Mixtecan languages, vol. 4, pp. 173–431. Dallas: Summer Institute of Linguistics.
 Hollenbach, Barbara. 2005. Vocabulario breve del triqui de San Juan Copala. (Available at )
 
 Longacre, Robert E. 1957. Proto-Mixtecan. International Journal of American Linguistics 23(4).
 Matsukawa, Kosuke. 2007. Preliminary Tone Analysis of Possessed Nouns in Chicahuaxtla Trique. UTA Working Papers in Linguistics 2006-2007, pp. 31–49. Arlington: University of Texas at Arlington.
 Matsukawa, Kosuke. 2008. Reconstruction of Proto-Trique Phonemes. U. Penn Working Papers in Linguistics 14(1):269-281. Philadelphia: University of Pennsylvania.
 Matsukawa, Kosuke. 2010. Tone Alternation Patterns for Potential Aspect in Chicahuaxtla Triqui. Proceedings of the Conference on Indigenous Languages of Latin America IV. Austin: AILLA, University of Texas at Austin.
 Matsukawa, Kosuke. 2012. Phonetics and Phonology of Chicahuaxtla Triqui Tones. Ph.D. dissertation, University at Albany, State University of New York.

External links
 Online dictionary of Copala Triqui
 Triqui language picture dictionary
 Triqui resources from Hollenbach
 Triqui resources from SIL
 Triqui resources  native-languages.org

Mesoamerican languages
Indigenous languages of Mexico
Verb–subject–object languages
Oto-Manguean languages
Mixtecan languages